1,3,5-Triazido-2,4,6-trinitrobenzene, also known as TATNB (triazidotrinitrobenzene) and TNTAZB (trinitrotriazidobenzene), is an aromatic high explosive composed of a benzene ring with three azido groups (-N) and three nitro groups (-NO) alternating around the ring, giving the chemical formula C(N)(NO). Its detonation velocity is 7,350 meters per second, which is comparable to TATB (triaminotrinitrobenzene).

Preparation 
The compound was first synthesized in 1924 by Oldřich Turek. It can be prepared by the reaction of 1,3,5-trichloro-2,4,6-trinitrobenzene with sodium azide. 1,3,5-trichloro-2,4,6-trinitrobenzene is obtained from the nitration of 1,3,5-trichlorobenzene with nitric acid and sulfuric acid.

Another route uses the nitration of 1,3,5-triazido-2,4-dinitrobenzene.

Properties

Chemical Properties 
Even at low temperatures, the compound slowly decomposes by giving off nitrogen gas, converting into benzotrifuroxan. This reaction proceeds quantitatively within 14 hours at 100 °C. As a solution in m-xylene, first order kinetics were observed for the decomposition, with a half-life of 340 minutes at 70 °C, 89 minutes at 80 °C, and 900 seconds at 100 °C.

The compound explodes if rapidly heated above 168 °C.

References

Explosive chemicals
Organoazides
Nitrobenzenes